Uriarte is a Basque language surname. Notable people with the surname include:

 Nicolás Uriarte
 Pedro Francisco de Uriarte
 Fidel Uriarte
 Fermín Uriarte
 Ana Lya Uriarte
 Daoiz Uriarte
 Nicolás Uriarte
 Ignacio Uriarte
 Jon Uriarte
 Sugoi Uriarte
 José Ramón Uriarte
 Higinio Uriarte
 José María de Torrijos y Uriarte

See also
 Uriarte Talavera

Basque-language surnames